Neoporteria is a genus of South American tangled nest spiders first described by Cândido Firmino de Mello-Leitão in 1943.  it contains only two species, both found in Chile.

References

Amaurobiidae
Araneomorphae genera
Endemic fauna of Chile